Kawolo-Sobara is a group of six villages (Sobara, Kogodian, Konota, Mangorosso, Dioulasso, and Sandakoro) in central Ivory Coast. It is in the sub-prefecture of Sokala-Sobara, Dabakala Department, Hambol Region, Vallée du Bandama District, located  14 km from the town of Dabakala.

Description
The population comprises about 5,000 Djimini people. Economic activity is exclusively concerned with agriculture and pastoralism, with intensive cultivation of cashews, yams, and peanuts. 

Kawolo-Sobara was a commune until March 2012, when it became one of 1126 communes nationwide that were abolished.

Notes

Former communes of Ivory Coast
Populated places in Vallée du Bandama District
Populated places in Hambol